The Norge was a semi-rigid Italian-built airship that carried out the first verified trip of any kind to the North Pole, an overflight on 12 May 1926. It was also the first aircraft to fly over the polar ice cap between Europe and America. The expedition was the brainchild of polar explorer and expedition leader Roald Amundsen, the airship's designer and pilot Umberto Nobile and American adventurer and explorer Lincoln Ellsworth who, along with the Aero Club of Norway, financed the trip, which was known as the Amundsen-Ellsworth 1926 Transpolar Flight.

Design and development 
[[File:NorgeTailplane.jpg|thumb|left|Fragments from the Norge'''s tail|120px]]Norge was the first N-class semi-rigid airship designed by Umberto Nobile, and its construction started in 1923. As part of the selling contract [as the Norge] it was refitted for Arctic conditions. The pressurised envelope was reinforced with metal frames at the nose and tail, with a flexible tubular metal keel connecting the two. This was covered with fabric and used as storage and crew space. Three engine gondolas and the separate control cabin were attached to the bottom of the keel. Norge was the first Italian semi-rigid to be fitted with the cruciform tail fins first developed by the Schütte-Lanz company.

 Polar expedition 

In 1925, Amundsen telegraphed Nobile asking to meet him at Oslo, where he proposed an airship trip across the Arctic. With a contract in place, Nobile modified the N-1 for flight in arctic weather. As the expedition was being financed by the Aero Club of Norway, the modified N-1 was christened the Norge (English: Norway).

On 29 March 1926 at a ceremony at Ciampino aerodrome the Norge was handed over to the Aero Club of Norway.  The flight north was due to leave Rome on 6 April but was delayed due to strong winds and departed at 09:25 on 10 April.  The ship arrived at RNAS Pulham Airship Station in England at 15:20; because of the bad weather was not moored in the hangar until 18:30. Delayed again by weather, the Norge left Pulham for Oslo at 11:45 on 12 April.

At 01:00 on 15 April 1926, the Norge left  Ekeberg in Oslo for Gatchina near Leningrad; after a 17-hour flight, the airship  arrived at 19:30, delayed by dense fog along the way. Following the arrival at Gatchina, Nobile announced that the Norge would remain in the airship shed for a week for engine overhaul and maintenance; this included the addition of collapsible rubber boats for emergency use.  Although expected to leave Gatchina as soon as the weather allowed after 24 April, the departure was delayed one week as the mooring mast at King's Bay, Spitsbergen had not yet been completed due to adverse weather. Although Nobile was anxious to leave for Spitsbergen even if the mast and shed were not completed as he was concerned about the weather, the departure from Gatchina was postponed once again.

The Norge finally left Gatchina at 09:40 on 5 May to proceed to Vadsø in northern Norway, where the airship mast is still standing today. The expedition then crossed the Barents Sea to reach King's Bay at Ny-Ålesund, Svalbard. There Nobile met Richard Evelyn Byrd preparing his Fokker Trimotor for his North Pole attempt. Nobile explained the Norge trip was to observe the uncharted sea between the Pole and Alaska where some believed land was; at the time he thought Robert Edwin Peary had already reached the pole. This would be the last stop before crossing the pole. The dirigible left Ny-Ålesund for the final stretch across the polar ice on 11 May at 9:55.

The 16-man expedition included Amundsen, the expedition leader and navigator; Umberto Nobile the dirigible's designer and pilot; Wealthy American outdoorsman, polar explorer and expedition sponsor Lincoln Ellsworth; as well as polar explorer Oscar Wisting who served as helmsman. Other crew members were 1st Lt. Hjalmar Riiser-Larsen, navigator; 1st Lt. Emil Horgen, elevatorman; Capt. Birger Gottwaldt, radio expert, Dr Finn Malmgren of Uppsala University, meteorologist; Fredrik Ramm, journalist; Frithjof Storm-Johnsen, radioman; Flying Lt. Oscar Omdal, flight engineer; Natale Cecioni, chief mechanic; Renato Alessandrini, rigger; Ettore Arduino, Attilio Caratti and Vincenzo Pomella, mechanics. Nobile's little dog, Titina, also came aboard as mascot.

On 12 May at 01:25 (GMT) the Norge  reached the North Pole, at which point the Norwegian, American and Italian flags were dropped from the airship onto the ice. Relations between Amundsen and Nobile, which had been lukewarm at best, were further strained by the freezing and noisy conditions in the dirigible's cramped control car, and became even worse when Amundsen saw that the Italian flag dropped by Nobile was larger than either of the others. Amundsen later recalled with scorn that under Nobile, the Norge  had become "a circus wagon of the skies", an occurrence Nobile claimed Amundsen had greatly exaggerated.

After crossing the pole, ice encrustations kept growing on the airship's propellers to such an extent that pieces breaking and flying off would strike the outer cover, causing rips and tears in the fabric. 

On 14 May, the Norge reached the Inupiat village of Teller, Alaska, where in view of worsening weather, the decision was made to land rather than continue the approximately 70 miles to Nome. The airship was reportedly damaged somehow during the landing and was dismantled and shipped back to Italy.

The three previous claims to have arrived at the North Pole—by Frederick Cook in 1908, Robert Peary in 1909, and Richard E. Byrd in 1926 (just a few days before the Norge)—are all disputed as being either of dubious accuracy or outright fraud. Some of those disputing these earlier claims therefore consider the crew of the Norge'' to be the first verified explorers to have reached the North Pole.

Specifications (Norge)

See also 
 Italia (airship)
 Norge Storage Site
 Spitsbergen Airship Museum

References

Footnotes

Sources 

 Roald Amundsen and Lincoln Ellsworth, First Crossing of the Polar Sea, Doubleday, Garden City, 1928.

External links 

 
 

1920s Italian civil utility aircraft
1926 in aviation
Airships of Italy
Arctic exploration vessels
Hydrogen airships
Individual aircraft
North Pole